Weightlifting at the 2013 Southeast Asian Games took place in Thein Phyu Stadium, Yangon, Myanmar between December 13–16. There were five weight categories for the women and six for the men.

Events
11 sets of medals were awarded in the following events:

Medalists

Men

Women

Medal table

References

 
2013 Southeast Asian Games events
Southeast Asian Games
2013
Weightlifting in Myanmar